Le Muy is a commune in the Var department in the Provence-Alpes-Côte d'Azur region in Southeastern France. In 2019, it had a population of 9,288.

Le Muy was one of the first places to be liberated in the Allied invasion of Southern France in August 1944. It lies to the southeast of Draguignan and north-northwest of Saint-Tropez.

Population

Tourism
In the Charles Quint Tower (Tour Charles Quint), tourists can visit the Liberation Museum, about Operation Dragoon in 1944.

See also
Communes of the Var department

References

External links

 Official site
 Tourisme Office website

Communes of Var (department)